The Bank of Missouri began as The Bank of Perryville which received a state charter on November 2, 1891.

From 1891 until 1902, The Bank of Perryville served as the only bank in Perry County, Missouri.

In June 1997, The Bank of Perryville changed its name to The Bank of Missouri, and expanded into Cape Girardeau, Missouri. Another location in Perryville was also built in 1997, and a loan production office opened in Jackson, Missouri in 1998.

The Bank of Missouri operates two banks in Perryville and Jackson, four in Cape Girardeau, and one each in Scott City, Patton, Marble Hill, Columbia, Steele and Caruthersville in Missouri, as well as offering full-service brokerage services and Bank of Missouri Investments and Retirement Planning division.

As of 2020, the bank has 37 branches in Missouri, and US$2.045 billion in assets. The bank offers credit cards that are issued by The Bank of Missouri, and it offers other credit cards for subprime borrowers. Fortiva Retail Credit is a consumer credit program in partnership with retail companies.

References

Banks based in Missouri
Banks established in 1891
1891 establishments in Missouri